Katy Selverstone (born February 4, 1966 in New York City) is an American actress. She is primarily known for her work on The Drew Carey Show as Lisa Robbins, Drew Carey's girlfriend in the first and second seasons.

Life & career
Selverstone was born in New York City, New York on February 4, 1966. She attended Scranton Central High School (Scranton, Pennsylvania) and Carnegie Mellon University and earned a BFA in acting.

Selverstone has worked on such high-profile television series as NYPD Blue, CSI and As The World Turns and has appeared in the films Divine Secrets of the Ya-Ya Sisterhood and South of Pico. She portrayed FBI agent Nancy Floyd in The Path to 9/11. She received the Grand Jury choice for Best Actress in a Feature for her role as "Una" in Laura Nix's film short The Politics of Fur.

Her other work includes playing Darlene, the receptionist at Gramercy Press, a fictional publishing company used in Network MCI commercials in 1994 and 1995. Selverstone also appeared on The L Word, Nip/Tuck and Seinfeld in the episode "The Face Painter" as Siena, George Costanza's girlfriend. Her character becomes George's fiancée in a deleted scene from "The Face Painter".

In 2000, Selverstone appeared on Broadway in Arthur Miller's play The Ride Down Mt. Morgan with actor Patrick Stewart for which she received a Fany award for Outstanding Broadway Debut. She has been awarded multiple awards for her work in "Breaking the Code", "Golden Boy", "Scotland Road", "Indiscretions", and "Big Love".

She has been noted for looking very similar to Jodie Foster.

Film

Television

Stage

References

External links
 

1966 births
Living people
American film actresses
American television actresses
American stage actresses
Actresses from New York City
21st-century American women